Kosonsoy is a district of Namangan Region in Uzbekistan. The capital lies at the city Kosonsoy. Its area is 517 km2. Its population is 212,900 (2021 est.).

The district consists of one city (Kosonsoy), 10 urban-type settlements (Bogʻishamol, Istiqlol, Koson, Ququmboy, Ozod, Tergachi, Chindavul, Chust koʻcha, Yangiyoʻl, Yangi shahar) and 7 rural communities.

References 

Districts of Uzbekistan
Namangan Region